The women's +78 kg competition at the 2022 European Judo Championships was held on 1 May at the Armeets Arena.

Results

Final

Repechage

Top half

Bottom half

References

External links
 

W79
European Judo Championships Women's Heavyweight
European W79